Tarlan is a class of fast torpedo boat operated by the Navy of the Islamic Revolutionary Guard Corps of Iran. A modified version of this class has been referred to as Dalaam.

History 
The class is manufactured by Iran, and was first reported in 2005.

Design

Dimensions and machinery 
It uses two surface piercing propellers, powered by two diesel engines.

Structure and armament 
The vessel's hull is made of aluminum, and is of catamaran type. It has a 1.5 high pedestal, which may be capable of supporting an anti-armor guided weapon. Tarlan boats can fire high-speed rocket torpedoes.

References 

Fast patrol boat classes of the Navy of the Islamic Revolutionary Guard Corps
Torpedo boat classes
Ships built by Marine Industries Organization